The following is a list of ambassadors that the United States has sent to Suriname.  The current title given by the United States State Department to this position is Ambassador Extraordinary and Minister Plenipotentiary.

See also
Suriname – United States relations
Foreign relations of Suriname
Ambassadors of the United States

References

United States Department of State: Background notes on Suriname

External links
 United States Department of State: Chiefs of Mission for Suriname
 United States Department of State: Suriname
 United States Embassy in Paramaribo

Suriname
Main
United States